My Soul to Take is a 2010 American slasher film written and directed by Wes Craven. It is his first film since 1994's Wes Craven's New Nightmare that he wrote, produced, and directed. The film stars Max Thieriot as Adam "Bug" Hellerman, who is one of seven teenagers chosen to die following the anniversary of a serial killer's death. Denzel Whitaker, Raul Esparza, and Shareeka Epps also star. The film's title comes from a line in the prayer "Now I Lay Me Down to Sleep", which reads "If I shall die before I wake, I pray the Lord my soul to take." Craven previously used the prayer as a mantra by Nancy Thompson in A Nightmare on Elm Street.

The film was released on October 8, 2010. It was unsuccessful at the box office, grossing just $21 million against its $25 million budget, and received mostly negative reviews from critics.

Plot
Family man Abel Plenkov, a sufferer of dissociative identity disorder, accidentally discovers that he is the Riverton Ripper, a local, masked serial killer. After killing his pregnant wife, Sarah, and then his psychiatrist, he is shot down and carted away in an ambulance, leaving his young daughter Leah and premature son orphaned. On the way to the hospital, a paramedic suggests that Plenkov himself is innocent but that he houses multiple souls, with the Ripper's being one of them. Near death, Plenkov unexpectedly revives, slashing the paramedic in the throat, causing the ambulance to crash and burn.

Seven children who were born on the day of Plenkov's death and supposedly carry the traits of his personalities are dubbed the Riverton Seven. Sixteen years later, the Riverton Seven –  blind Jerome, loser Alex, imaginative Jay, timid Bug, religious Penelope, beautiful Brittany, and jock Brandon — gather for the annual ritual of "killing" a Ripper puppet to superstitiously prevent his return. Bug is elected but fails. Not long after, Jay is murdered by the reappeared Ripper. At home, Bug begins to redo a class project, exhibiting Jay's creativity.

At school, Brandon torments Bug and Alex on orders of Fang, a tyrannical bully. Bug and Alex decide to spy on Fang to see if Brittany has a crush on him. During their surveillance, Fang cruelly alleges that Bug had previously been in institutions for killing people. Bug begins unwittingly imitating the rest of the Riverton Seven, as well as Fang. Penelope, having predicted the Ripper's return as well as their deaths, is the next one killed. Brandon and Brittany discover her body in the woods and are both stabbed to death also.

That night, Fang, who is revealed to be Bug's sister and going by her name of Leah, gives her brother a birthday present: a rocking horse created by Abel Plenkov. Angrily, she unveils the truth that had long been hidden: that they are his children and she is the daughter he had failed to kill; Bug had survived in his dead mother's womb albeit born prematurely. Everyone saw him as a miracle, which caused Fang to harbor lifelong resentment towards him; she had been traumatized by the event but he remained innocent of its memory. The two reconcile, but are informed of the murders.

Alex visits a distressed Bug and theorizes that the Ripper's evil soul jumped into one of the Riverton Seven, forcing them to kill off the others. Downstairs, Bug and Fang encounter the Ripper. Just as Bug is about to be killed, the Ripper hears a noise upstairs. Bug goes back to his room, discovering Jerome, mortally wounded, in his closet. After Jerome dies, Alex reappears and suggests that Bug inherited Dissociative Identity Disorder from his father, and had unknowingly killed everyone. Bug rejects this idea. The souls of the dead Seven are now part of him, and together they help him deduce that Alex is, in fact, the one with the Ripper's soul. "Alex" admits guilt and confesses his revenge. He proposes that they kill Fang and pin the murders on Jerome to appear as heroes. Bug refuses, stabbing Alex in the stomach. Freed from the Ripper's soul, Alex dies as himself in a touching moment between best friends.

Although Bug expects to be arrested, Fang tells the police everything, clearing his name. The town proclaims him a hero. Despite not feeling like one, he narrates that he would "fake it good" in order to honor Alex's memory.

Cast

 Max Thieriot as Adam 'Bug' Hellerman 
 John Magaro as Alex Dunkelman
 Denzel Whitaker as Jerome King
 Zena Grey as Penelope Bryte
 Nick Lashaway as Brandon O'Neil
 Paulina Olszynski as Brittany Cunningham
 Jeremy Chu as Jay Chan
 Emily Meade as Leah 'Fang' Hellerman
 Raul Esparza as Abel Plenkov
 Jessica Hecht as May Hellerman
 Frank Grillo as Detective Frank Patterson
 Danai Gurira as Jeanne-Baptiste
 Harris Yulin as Dr. Blake
 Shareeka Epps as Chandelle King
 Dennis Boutsikaris as Principal Pratt
 Felix Solis as Chela
 Trevor St. John as Lake
 Lou Sumrall as Quint
 Alexandra Wilson as Sarah Plenkov
 Michael Bell as Podcast guest

Production
The film is produced by Anthony Katagas and first-time producer Iya Labunka, Craven's wife.

Casting
Henry Hopper, son of actor Dennis Hopper, was originally cast in the lead role of Bug, but was replaced by Thieriot after Hopper contracted mononucleosis. Accompanying Thieriot is John Magaro as Alex Dunkelman, Adam's friend who is abused regularly by his sadistic and boorish stepfather, Quint (Lou Sumrall). Paulina Olszynski plays Brittany Cunningham, who shares a mutual secret attraction to Adam. Nick Lashaway plays Brandon O'Neal, a "dashing, athletic jock" and "the handsomest boy in his school" who is attracted to Brittany. Emily Meade plays Leah ("Fang"). (Zena Grey), Denzel Whitaker, Trevor St. John, Raúl Esparza, and Shareeka Epps also star.

Filming
Production began in April 2008, under the working title 25/8, originally aiming for an October 2009 release. Craven described the killer in March 2009 as "a figure who lives under the river", eats bark, and lives in the woods since his alleged death.

Although many of the main scenes were filmed in multiple rural Massachusetts towns, with the majority of outdoor scenes by the river and covered bridge being shot in Kent, CT at Bull's Bridge, many of the high school scenes were shot in the then-vacant Tolland High School (now Tolland Middle School) in Tolland, Connecticut. Other scenes were filmed in New Milford, CT and Gaylordsville, CT and Westhill High School in Stamford, CT.

Post-production
The film was shot in 2D. Because of the rising popularity of 3D films, it was post-converted to 3-D.

Release
My Soul to Take was theatrically released on October 8, 2010, with screenings in 3-D. The trailer was attached to Resident Evil: Afterlife and Devil. The film opened at #4 on its opening Friday, but ultimately placed at #5 for the weekend with $6,842,220 behind The Social Network, Life as We Know It, Secretariat, and the previous 3D screen holder Legend of the Guardians: The Owls of Ga'Hoole, in its third weekend. It had placed the record for the lowest opening of a 3D film released at over 1500 venues, claiming the record from Alpha and Omega until Gulliver's Travels claimed the record two months later.

At the end of its run, the film had grossed $14,744,435 at the US box office and $6,740,619 overseas for a worldwide total of $21,485,054. My Soul to Take was released on DVD and Blu-ray on February 8, 2011.

Reception

On Rotten Tomatoes the film holds an approval rating of 10% from 63 reviews, with an average rating of 3.4/10. The site's critics consensus reads: "Dull, joyless, and formulaic, My Soul to Take suggests writer/director Wes Craven ended his five-year filmmaking hiatus too soon." On Metacritic, the film has a weighted average score of 25 out of 100 based on 13 critics, indicating "generally unfavorable reviews". Audiences polled by CinemaScore gave the film an average grade of "D" on an A+ to F scale.

Despite the negative reviews, Wes Craven said he was proud of the film: "When you do a film like My Soul to Take and people think it sucks, that hurts. We put a lot of work into it and it's a good film, but you go on."

References

External links
 
 
 
 
 

2010 films
2010 3D films
2010 horror films
2010s American films
2010s English-language films
2010s slasher films
2010s teen horror films
American serial killer films
American slasher films
American supernatural horror films
American teen horror films
Films about dissociative identity disorder
Films about school bullying
Films about spirit possession
Films directed by Wes Craven
Films scored by Marco Beltrami
Films set in 2009
Films set in the 1990s
Films shot in Connecticut
Relativity Media films
Rogue (company) films